Gusheh-ye Olya (also Romanized as Gūsheh-ye ‘Olyā; also known as Gūsheh and Gūsheh-ye Bālā) is a village in Poshteh-ye Zilayi Rural District, Sarfaryab District, Charam County, Kohgiluyeh and Boyer-Ahmad Province, Iran. At the 2006 census, its population was 113, in 19 families.

References 

Populated places in Charam County